The United States ambassador to the United Kingdom (known formally as the ambassador of the United States to the Court of St James's) is the official representative of the president of the United States and the American government to the monarch and government of the United Kingdom. The position is held by Jane D. Hartley, who presented her credentials to Queen Elizabeth II on July 19, 2022.

The position is regarded as one of the most prestigious posts in the United States Foreign Service due to the "Special Relationship" between the United States and United Kingdom. The ambassadorship has been held by various notable politicians, including five who would later become presidents: John Adams, James Monroe, John Quincy Adams, Martin Van Buren and James Buchanan. However, the modern tendency of American presidents (of both parties) is to appoint keen political fundraisers from previous presidential campaigns, despite the importance and prestige of the office.

The ambassador and executive staff work at the American Embassy in Nine Elms, London. The official residence of the ambassador is Winfield House in Regent's Park.

Duties 
The ambassador's main duty is to present US policies to the government of the United Kingdom and its people, as well as report British policies and views to the federal government of the United States. The ambassador serves as a primary channel of communication between the two nations and plays an important role in treaty negotiations.

The ambassador is the head of the United States' consular service in the United Kingdom. As well as directing diplomatic activity in support of trade, the ambassador is ultimately responsible for visa services and for the provision of consular support to American citizens in the UK and oversees cultural relations between the two countries.

List of US chiefs of mission to the Court of St James's

Ministers (1785–1811) 

 Independent 

 Democratic-Republican 

 Democrat 

 Whig

 Republican

John Adams is referred to as the first "ambassador".  He is also referred to as the first "minister plenipotentiary".  Plenipotentiary means "having full power"; a minister that has power to act for their country in all matters.

Ministers (1815–1893) 

Diplomatic relations with Great Britain were restored after the War of 1812. The Congress of Vienna (1815) established a uniform system of diplomatic rank.  Under that system, the highest rank of "ambassador" was a personal representative of a sovereign, and the next rank of "minister", represented a government.  As a republic, the United States maintained diplomatic relations with Great Britain at the rank of Envoy Extraordinary and Minister Plenipotentiary. The rank was colloquially known as Minister, and the position continued to be referred to as "United States Minister to Great Britain".

Ambassadors (1893–present) 

Although France became a republic in 1870, the country continued to exchange ambassadors with other Great Powers. In 1893, the United States followed the French precedent and upgraded its relations with other Great Powers to the ambassadorial level.  The United States Legation in London became the United States Embassy, and the United States Minister to Great Britain became the United States Ambassador to Great Britain.

See also 
 Ambassadors of the United States
 Embassy of the United Kingdom, Washington, D.C.
 Foreign relations of the United Kingdom
 List of ambassadors of the United Kingdom to the United States
 United Kingdom–United States relations

Notes

References 

United States Department of State: Background notes on the United Kingdom

Further reading

External links 
 United States Department of State: Chiefs of Mission for the United Kingdom
 United States Department of State: United Kingdom
 United States Embassy in London

 
United Kingdom
Lists of ambassadors to the United Kingdom
Politics of the United Kingdom